The governor of Tlaxcala is the position representing the complete executive power of the government of the Mexican state of Tlaxcala, per the Political Constitution of the Free and Sovereign State of Tlaxcala.

The governor is elected for a period of six years, and cannot be re-elected for any reason. The term of office begins on January 15 and ends on January 14, six years later. Elections are held 1 year prior to presidential elections.

To be elected, the candidate must be a natural-born citizen of Mexico, at least 30 years of age, and a resident of Tlaxcala for at least 5 years prior to the election.

Governors of the Free and Sovereign State of Tlaxcala
Source: World Statesmen
30 Sep 1866 - 11 Mar 1867  Antonio Rodríguez Bocardo (in opposition to 27 Nov 1866)
11 Mar 1867 - 17 Apr 1872  Miguel Lira y Ortega (1st time)    (b. 1827 - d. 1882)
18 Apr 1872 -  9 Aug 1872  Pedro Pérez Lira (1st time)
 9 Aug 1872 - 30 Sep 1872  Francisco Paz
30 Sep 1872 - 14 Jan 1876  Melquíades Carbajal
14 Jan 1876 - 15 Jan 1876  José Manuel Saldaña (4th time)
15 Jan 1876 - 20 Jan 1876  Miguel Sevilla
20 Jan 1876 - 22 Mar 1876  Pedro Pérez Lira (2nd time)
22 Mar 1876 -  6 Feb 1877  Doroteo Léon
 6 Feb 1877 - 20 Feb 1877  Vicente Marquez Galindo (interim)
20 Feb 1876 - 14 Mar 1877  Miguel Andrade Parraga (interim)
14 Mar 1877 - 15 Jan 1881  Miguel Lira y Ortega (2nd time)    (s.a.)
15 Jan 1881 - 31 Jul 1884  José María Grajales
31 Jul 1884 - 15 Jan 1885  Teodoro Rivera
15 Jan 1885 - 30 May 1911  Próspero Cahuantzi
30 May 1911 -  7 Jun 1911  Diego L. Kennedy
 7 Jun 1911 - 30 Aug 1911  Agustín Sánchez (1st time) (interim)
 1 Sep 1911 - 30 Nov 1911  Ramón M. Maldonado (interim)
 1 Dec 1911 - 14 Jan 1913  Antonio Hidalgo Sandoval 
15 Jan 1913 -  3 Feb 1913  Agustín Sánchez (2nd time) (interim)
 4 Feb 1913 -  1 Mar 1913  Agustín Maldonado
 1 Mar 1913 - 17 Mar 1913  José Mariano Grajales
17 Mar 1913 - 15 May 1913  Alberto Yarza  (Military)
15 May 1913 - 1914         Manuel Cuéllar Alarcón
15 Aug 1914 - 20 Aug 1914  Luis J. García
21 Aug 1914 - 26 Nov 1914  Máximo Rojas (1st time)
26 Nov 1914 - 15 Jan 1915  Alejo González
15 Jan 1915 - 16 May 1915  Máximo Rojas (2nd time) (Military)
16 May 1915 - 10 Jun 1916  Porfirio del Castillo (provisional) (Military)
10 Jul 1916 - 18 Apr 1917  Antonio M. Machorro (interim)
18 Apr 1917 -  1 Oct 1917  Daniel Ríos Zertuche (provisional)
 1 Oct 1917 - 30 May 1918  Luis M. Hernandez (provisional)
31 May 1918 -  7 May 1920  Máximo Rojas (3rd time) (Military)
 7 May 1920 -  5 Nov 1920  Ignacio Mendoza (1st time)
17 Nov 1920 - 30 Nov 1920  Octavio Hidalgo
 1 Dec 1920 - 14 Jan 1921  Manuel R. Solís
15 Jan 1921 - 14 Jan 1925  Rafael Apango
15 Jan 1925 - 14 Jan 1929  Ignacio Mendoza (2nd time)
15 Jan 1929 -  5 Jan 1933  Adrián Vázquez Sánchez  
 5 Jan 1933 - 15 Jan 1933  Moisés Rosalía García (interim)  
15 Jan 1933 -  1 Apr 1933  Mauro Angulo (1st time) (interim)  
1 Apr 1933 - 23 Dec 1933  Adolfo Bonilla (1st time)  
23 Dec 1933 - 14 Jun 1934  Tomás Sánchez Pérez (substitute) 
(1934–1937): Adolfo Bonilla, National Revolutionary Party, PNR
(1937–1940): Isidro Candia, PNR
(1940–1941): Joaquín Cisneros Molina, Party of the Mexican Revolution, PRM
(1941–1944): Manuel Santillán, PRM
(1944–1945): Mauro Angulo, PRM
(1945–1951): Rafael Avila Bretón, PRM
(1951–1957): Felipe Mazarraza 
(1957–1963): Joaquín Cisneros Molina 
(1963–1969): Anselmo Cervantes 

(1969–1970): Ignacio Bonilla Vázquez 
(1970): Crisanto Cuéllar Abaroa 
(1970–1975): Luciano Huerta Sánchez 
(1975–1981): Emilio Sánchez Piedras 
(1981–1987): Tulio Hernández Gómez 
(1987–1992): Beatriz Paredes Rangel 
(1992–1993): Samuel Quiróz de la Vega (interim)
(1993–1999): José Antonio Álvarez Lima 
(1999–2005): Alfonso Sánchez Anaya 
(2005–2011): Héctor Ortiz Ortiz 
(2011–2016): Mariano González Zarur 
(2017–2021): Marco Antonio Mena Rodríguez 
(2021–present: Lorena Cuéllar Cisneros

See also
Tlaxcala

References

List
Tlaxcala